Bernard Sladden (1879–1961) was a notable New Zealand farmer, wildlife ranger, historian and naturalist. He was born in Oxford, North Canterbury, New Zealand in 1879.

References

1879 births
1961 deaths
New Zealand naturalists
New Zealand farmers
20th-century New Zealand historians
People from Oxford, New Zealand